Mutarnee is a town and a locality in the City of Townsville, Queensland, Australia.

Geography 
Mutarnee is approximately 67 kilometres north-west of Townsville, Queensland, Australia and 44 kilometres south-east of Ingham. It is situated on the banks of Crystal Creek and is near the rainforest village of Paluma.

History 
Mutarnee takes its name from its railway station, which in turn was named on  23 December 1920 by the Queensland Railways Department using an Aboriginal word indicating food, as suggested by Archibald Meston.

Ollera Provisional School opened in 1905 and closed in 1906. Ollera Creek State School opened on 17 May 1920. In 1923 it was renamed Mutarnee State School.

Facilities 
Facilities at Mutarnee include a state primary school, a recreational waterhole, and a camping area at nearby Crystal Creek. The popular cafe and ice-creamery, Frosty Mango, is also located in Mutarnee, north of the Crystal Creek bridge.

Education 
Mutarnee State School is a government primary (Prep-6) school for boys and girls at School Road. In 2017, the school had an enrolment of 19 students with  3 teachers (1 full-time equivalent) and 3 non-teaching staff (1 full-time equivalent).

References 

Suburbs of Townsville
Localities in Queensland